Tengri Qaghan (Old Turkic: 𐱅𐰭𐰼𐰃:𐰴𐰍𐰣) (734 or 739 or 740 – 741) was the sixth ruler of the Second Turkic Khaganate.

Background 
He was the second son of the fourth ruler, Bilge Khagan, and was preceded by his elder brother Yollig Khagan. Tengri was a minor and dominated by his mother Po Beg.

Reign 
In 740, Xuanzong sent his envoy Li Zhi (李質) who declared him Tengri Khagan. His mother El Bilge Khatun and chancellor Yusi Tarkhan (飫斯達幹) conspired together to centralize the state and kill the cousins who were ruling as governors in the west and the east. While they succeeded killing the western shad, the eastern shad Pan Kul Tigin rebelled and marched on the capital. He captured Tengri and executed him, causing his mother and regent El Bilge Khatun to flee.

After death 
Pan Kul Tigin crowned another brother of Tengri in 741 and himself as regent. However, he was soon defeated by rebelling Basmyl chief Ashina Shi (阿史那施), another rebel who was his nephew.

References

Sources

Christoph Baumer, History of Central Asia, volume 2, p 263.
Lev Gumilyov, The Ancient Turks, 1967, Chapters xxiii+xxvi (long account in Russian at)

Göktürk khagans
Tengrist monarchs